Susana Romero (born Buenos Aires, 20 June 1958) is an Argentine actress, speaker, and vedette, and animal rights activist.

Biography 
Romero, nicknamed "La negra", is recognised in the entertainment world for interpreting sexy and funny characters in Argentine cinema. She is also an animal rights defender and vegan. On 17 June 1973, she was named Miss Argentina. In Athens Greece, during the Miss Universe contest, she came in sixth place. Upon her return to Argentina, she began a successful career as a model and comedy actress, in theatre and television. In 2008, Romero published a book, El amor después de la pena. 
In December 1988, Romero married Abel Jacubovich. They have two daughters.

Acting career

Television
In 1971, Romero began her television career on the Channel 13 musical program .
 1990 - Played "Reina" in the telenovela .
 1991 - Comedy series
 2004 - Movete, series on América TV
 2004 - Presented on cable TV alongside Alberto Muney
 2008 - TV producer and presenter, Nattiva (Channel 13)
 2012 - Sos mi Vida (Channel 13)
 2012 -  (Telefe)
 2013 -  (América TV)

Advertising campaigns 
 1977: Virginia Slims cigarettes
 1980: signed by Beguedor of Paris, in France worked for the Élite agency, modeled for Valentino, selected to interview with Salvador Dalí as a potential nude subject
 1986: Jockey Club
 2010: Featured with others in Razones para ser vegetariano (Reasons to Be Vegetarian), video for AnimaNaturalis

Film 
Romero debuted her motion picture career in 1985 with the drama The Rigorous Fate. The same year, she appeared in El cazador de la muerte. In 1996, she appeared in  Corsarios del chip, a Spanish film.

Theatre 
 1986: El negro no puede
 1988: Con el tango y la inflación, llegamos a la elección
 1996: Más feliz en Carlos Paz
 1996: Más loca que una vaca
 1998: Gansoleros - Teatro Lido, Mar del Plata
 2000: Se vino 2000!!!
 2006: Marido 4x4
 2008: Sera trolo mi marido? - concert theatre
 2013: La Cenicienta - Teatro Moulin Bleu

Radio 
 1987: La trasnoche del camionero - 
 2005: Taraguí - Radio Solidaria
 2012/2013: Taykuma - Radio Dakota

References

External links 
 Official website
 

Argentine stage actresses
1958 births
People from Tucumán Province
Argentine vedettes
Argentine film actresses
Living people
Miss Universe 1973 contestants